Jamie-Lee O'Donnell (born 4 March 1987) is a Northern Irish actress from Derry. She is best known for her role as Michelle Mallon in the Channel 4 sitcom Derry Girls.

Early life
O’Donnell was born on 4 March 1987 to a large family in Derry, Northern Ireland. She attended St Anne's Primary School, St Cecilia's College, and North West Regional College.

She began acting at a young age in school plays. Upon graduation, she decided to pursue it professionally despite not being able to afford drama school. She instead studied performing arts at De Montfort University in Bedfordshire. She began auditioning and dividing her time between England and home, taking part in theatrical productions and working as a dancer for promotions and pantomimes.

Career
Between 2012 and 2015, O'Donnell played her first significant role as Eva Maguire, one of the main characters of the BBC2 NI series 6Degrees, after the end of which she took part in the film Urban & the Shed Crew, by Candida Brady.

In 2018, she starred in a theatre production I Told My Mum I Was Going on an RE Trip, by Julia Samuels, playing an underage girl who decides to undergo an abortion. The following year, she joined the cast of Girls and Dolls, a play by the Derry Girls creator Lisa McGee, and acted in Martin McDonagh's The Cripple of Inishmaan at the Gaiety Theatre.

O'Donnell later landed the role of Michelle Mallon in Derry Girls, a sitcom by Channel 4, which gained international fame. Of her role as Michelle, she says, "Michelle really thinks she's maybe just a bit too big for the place she was born in and she's ready to take on the world one swearword at a time. She's really feisty, really ballsy, doesn't really care about authority, just sort of up for anything and up for a laugh."

O'Donnell and her fellow Derry Girls costars participated in the RTÉ fundraising special RTÉ Does Comic Relief, performing a sketch alongside Saoirse Ronan. All proceeds from the night went towards those affected by the COVID-19 pandemic.

Personal life 
O'Donnell lives in Derry with her partner, DJ Paul McCay. She is a patron of the Liverpool-based youth theatre company 20 Stories High.

Filmography

Film

Television

References

External links 

1987 births
20th-century births
Living people
21st-century actresses from Northern Ireland
Alumni of De Montfort University
Actors from Derry (city)
Television actresses from Northern Ireland